Oumé Department is a department of Gôh Region in Gôh-Djiboua District, Ivory Coast. In 2021, its population was 260,786 and its seat is the settlement of Oumé. The sub-prefectures of the department are Diégonéfla, Guépahouo, Oumé, and Tonla.

History
Oumé Department was created in 1980 as a split-off from Gagnoa Department.

In 1997, regions were introduced as new first-level subdivisions of Ivory Coast; as a result, all departments were converted into second-level subdivisions. Oumé Department was initially included in Marahoué Region, but in 2000 Oumé Department was combined with Haut-Sassandra's Gagnoa Department to create Fromager Region.

In 2011, districts were introduced as new first-level subdivisions of Ivory Coast. At the same time, regions were reorganised and became second-level subdivisions and all departments were converted into third-level subdivisions. At this time, Oumé Department became part of Gôh Region in Gôh-Djiboua District.

Notes

Departments of Gôh
1980 establishments in Ivory Coast
States and territories established in 1980